Stepping Selection is a rhythm game for the PlayStation 2. It was released exclusively for Japanese markets on March 4, 2000. The game is based on Jaleco's Stepping Stage series of arcade games, featuring shortened versions of popular songs accompanied by videos loosely related to them.

Song list 

Most tracks in the game are covers of the original songs, but some are original recordings, which are indicated in bold.

Reception 
On release, Famitsu magazine scored the PlayStation 2 version of the game a 32 out of 40.

References 

2000 video games
Dance video games
Music video games
PlayStation 2 games
PlayStation 2-only games
Japan-exclusive video games
Video games developed in Japan
Jaleco games